Neuteich may refer to:

Nowy Staw, Poland, Neuteich in German
Marian Neuteich